Donn B. Tatum (January 9, 1913 – May 31, 1993) was an American businessman and the first non-Disney family member to be an executive of Walt Disney Productions. Tatum held senior leadership positions with Disney for 25 years, becoming President from 1968 to 1971, when he became CEO from 1971 until 1980. His final position was "Director Emeritus" from 1992 until his death. He played a major role in the creation of Walt Disney World Resort, EPCOT Center and Tokyo Disneyland.

Early life 
Tatum was born on January 9, 1913. He grew up in Los Angeles and graduated magna cum laude from Stanford University, with a Bachelor of Arts degree in political science and earned two law degrees from Oxford University. He passed the California bar in 1938 and became involved in entertainment law at Lillick, Geary and McHose. 

He held a number of co. positions and served as counsel for RCA, NBC and ABC. He became general manager of KABC-TV in Los Angeles and Western television director for ABC.

Walt Disney Company 
Tatum joined Disney as production business manager in 1956 and in 1971, became chief executive and board chairman following the death of Roy O. Disney — becoming the first non-Disney family member to head the company. Tatum served as CEO until November 1976 and as chairman. 

On June 3, 1980, he retired as chairman and CEO of Disney Productions turning over the company to Card Walker. He stayed on the Disney board as executive committee chair. 

In 1993, Tatum was named a Disney Legend.

Public service
He was CalArts board chairman and president of the Disney Foundation, California Broadcasting Assn., United Cerebral Palsy Assn. and Stanford Club of Los Angeles. 

Tatum was a fellow of the Royal Society of Arts, London, and an honorary member of the Academy of Television Arts & Sciences and Hollywood Radio & Television Society. 

He served as a board member of The Huntington Library, California State Fair and Exposition, Los Angeles Philharmonic Association., Los Angeles Chamber of Commerce, Better Business Bureau of Los Angeles, the John Tracy Clinic, Western Digital, Union Oil, Bank of America and Greyhound Lines.

Death 
Tatum died on May 31, 1993 of cancer at his home in Pacific Palisades. Then Disney CEO Michael Eisner, and President Frank Wells said "He served as a director of the company until his resignation last year, when he was named director emeritus.  The world will miss Donn, but we at Disney who looked to him for wisdom, guidance and balance will miss him more."

References 

1913 births
1993 deaths
20th-century American businesspeople
Businesspeople from Los Angeles
Disney executives
Chairmen of The Walt Disney Company
Directors of The Walt Disney Company